The Royal Swedish Ballet is one of the oldest ballet companies in Europe. Based in Stockholm, Sweden, King Gustav III founded the ballet in 1773 as a part of his national cultural project in response to the French and Italian dominance in this field; he also founded the Royal Swedish Opera and the Royal Dramatic Theatre. All of these were initially located in the old theatre of Bollhuset. The troupe was founded with the opening of the Royal Swedish Opera, which has served as its home since that time.

History 
In 1773, the cultural professions of acting, opera-singing and ballet-dancing in Sweden were all performed by foreign troupes. The first ballet performance was performed at the Swedish court when the French ballet troupe of Antoine de Beaulieu was hired at the court of Queen Christina in 1638, and the first Public ballet performance were performed by the foreign theatre troupes at the theatre of Bollhuset later the same century. The only exception had been the period of 1737–1753, when the first professional Swedish troupe of actors had performed at Bollhuset; during this period, ballets were performed by the first Swedish dancers in this troupe. The perhaps first ballet performed by professional native Swedish dancers was in the play Den afvundsiuke ("The Envious") by Olof von Dahlin in August 1738. However, no names are known about these first dancers. They were probably educated by Jean Marquard as dancing-master, and one of the dancers were also French, Gabriel Senac. In 1753, however, the first Swedish ballet, theatre and opera at Bollhuset were dissolved.    

Gustav III wanted to create and educate native talents in these professions. To accomplish this, he used the same method in the ballet as he was to use with the theatre; by having the first generation of native dancers educated by foreign professionals. When he fired the French theatre-company to create his national-stage in 1773, he kept many of the French dancers of this troupe. Dancers from France, Italy and Belgium, such as Antoine Bournonville, Louis Gallodier, Giovanna Bassi and Julie Alix de la Fay were hired to perform and to educate Swedish students. Most of the first students to the troupe were taken among children to the staff at the royal court and to professional musicians, as were the first students to the theatre and the opera. In the first ballet-troupe in the national stage of 1773, they were very few native talents with former professional experience; one of them was Charlotte Slottsberg, who could be counted as the first native Swedish ballerina known by name. The greatest triumph of the Swedish ballet during the 18th century is considered to be the Ballet performed by Gallodier to the Opera Gustav Adolf och Ebba Brahe (Gustav Adolf and Ebba Brahe) (1786); also the Ballet Fiskarna (The Fishes) by Antoine Bournonville (1789) became a great success.

The Ballet was from the beginning closely linked to the Opera; ballets were a part of the performances of the Opera, and the dancers were also active on the Royal Dramatic Theatre. When the Royal Swedish Opera were closed down between 1806 and 1809–1812, the Ballet was not closed, only moved over to the theatre.

During the 19th century, new ballets were made all the time, and older ones seldom performed; En komisk balett (A comic Ballet) by Louis Deland was given 127 times between 1796 and 1809, followed by La Fille Mal Gardée, given 54 times in 1812–1842. August Bournonville was active as a guest Ballet master 1839, 1847, 1857, 1858 and 1861–1864, and his favorite Swedish ballerinas Charlotta Norberg and Johanna Sundberg educated students in his techniques. The Ballet is considered to have been in a state of decay during the end of the 19th century; after the dismissal of Anders Selinder and Sophie Daguin in 1856, the Ballet was used more as a supplement to the opera and not as an independent artform, and Sigurd Lund, a student of Bournonville, was not independent enough to prevent this. It was not until 1913, that the Ballet returned to a more independent form.

The Kungliga Hovkapellet (Royal Swedish Orchestra), the orchestra of the Royal Swedish Opera, is the performing partner for the Royal Swedish Ballet.

Nicolas LeRiche is the director of the Royal Swedish Ballet.
Birgitta Svendén is the general director of the Royal Swedish Opera. The members of Operans Balettklubb are supporters of the Royal Swedish Ballet.

Ballet Masters 

 1773–1803 : Louis Gallodier
 1803–1804 : Filippo Taglioni
 1804–1806 : Federico Nadi Terrade
 1806–1816 : Louis Deland (1st time)
 1817–1818 : Filippo Taglioni
 1818–1820 : Louis Deland (second time)
 1820–1823 : André Isidore Carey
 1823–1827 : Giovanni Battista Ambrosiani
 1827–1830 : Sophie Daguin (jointly with Wallqvist)
 1827–1833 : Per Erik Wallqvist
 1833–1856 : Anders Selinder
 1856–1862 : Sigurd Harald Lund (1st time)
 1862–1870 : Théodore Martin
 1870–1886 : Theodore Marckl
 1887–1890 : Robert Sjöblom
 1890–1894 : Sigurd Harald Lund (second time)
 1894–1901 : Max Glasemann
 1901–1905 : Otto Zöbisch  (1st time)
 1905–1908 : Robert Köller
 1911–1913 : Otto Zöbisch (second time)
 1918–1920 : Michel Fokine
 1922–1926 : Gunhild Rosén
 1926–1927 : Lise Steier
 1927–1931 : Jan Cieplinsky
 1931–1951 : Julian Algo
 1949–1951 : Antony Tudor
 1953–1962 : Mary Skeaping
 1962–1963 : Antony Tudor
 1964–1966 : Brian Macdonald
 1967–1971 : Erik Bruhn
 1971–1980 : Ivo Cramér
 1980–1984 : Gunilla Roempke
 1986–1993 : Nils Ake-Häggbom
 1993–1995 : Simon Mottram
 1995–1999 : Frank Andersen
 1999–2001 : Petter Jacobsson
 2002–2008 : Madeleine Onne
 2008–2011 : Marc Ribaud
 2011–2017 : Johannes Öhman
 Since 2017 : Nicolas Le Riche

Principal dancers 

Brendan Collins
Marie Lindqvist
Dragoș Mihalcea
Jenny Nilson
Nathalie Nordquist (on leave)
Anders Nordström
Christian Rambe
Nadja Sellrup
Judith Simon
Anna Valev
Olof Westring
Jan-Erik Wikström
Calum Lowden

Soloists 

Katja Björner
Jenny Brandt
Ann Brattselius
Jurgita Dronina
Karin Forslind
Nikolaus Fotiadis
Tibor Horvath
Magdalena Irigoyen
Pascal Jansson
Calum Lowden
Eunsun Jun
Irina Laurenova
Andrey Leonovitch
Nathalie Perriraz
Nicole Rhodes
Jens Rosén
Oscar Salomonsson
Lykke Håkansson
Joakim Stephenson
Hugo Therkelson
Gina Tse
Jenny Westring
Johannes Öhman (on leave)

Stockholm 59° North 

Stockholm 59° North is a chamber company of soloist dancers from the Royal Swedish Ballet.

Artistic Director is Mia Hjelte.

See also 
Royal Swedish Opera
Drottningholm Palace Theatre
Confidencen – Ulriksdal Palace Theatre
Charlotte Slottsberg
Hedda Hjortsberg
Ulrika Åberg

References 

Kennedy Center Arts Edge
 Georg Nordensvan : Svensk teater och Svenska skådespelare. Första bandet 1773–1842 (1917) 
 Tryggve Byström: Svenska Komedien, 1737–1754
 Klas Ralf, Prisma: Operan 200 år. Jubelboken
 Klas Åke Heed: Ny svensk teaterhistoria. Teater före 1800. Gidlunds förlag (2007)

External links 
Royal Swedish Ballet homepage on Operan.se  (click "language" for English translation)
Archival footage of Stockholm/59 North performing Dancing on the Front Porch of Heaven in 1997 at Jacob's Pillow
NY Times review of Stockholm/59° North at Jacob's Pillow August 5, 2005

 
1773 establishments in Sweden
Ballet companies in Sweden
1773 in Sweden
History of ballet